Christopher M. Vance (born May 1, 1962) is an American politician who served two terms on the Metropolitan King County Council and is a former member of the Washington State Legislature. Vance is former chair of the Washington State Republican Party. He and his wife Ann raised their son and daughter in Auburn, Washington and now live in Sumner, Washington. Vance ran unsuccessfully for the U.S. Senate, losing to Democratic incumbent Patty Murray in the 2016 election by 18 percentage points.

In September 2017 he announced that he had left the Republican Party and had become an independent.

Early life and education
Vance was born in Seattle in 1962, and lived in Bellevue until the eighth grade, when his family moved to east Pierce County. In 1980, Vance graduated from Sumner High School. He attended Western Washington University where he earned a bachelor's degree in Political Science.

Political career
After college Vance went to work for former Congressman Rod Chandler, then served as a research analyst with the Washington State Senate.

From 1991 to 1993 Vance served in the Washington House of Representatives for the 31st Legislative District, following an unsuccessful 1988 bid. He was the second ranking Republican on the House Education Committee, and was elected by his colleagues to the position of Assistant Floor Leader. From 1994 to 2001 he represented the 13th district of the King County Council, acting as a leader in the areas of budget, transportation and land-use. In 2000, he unsuccessfully ran for Congress.

In 2001, Vance was elected Chairman of the Washington State Republican Party. He worked to get Republican officials elected, including Rob McKenna, the first Republican State Attorney General in 13 years.

2004 Washington gubernatorial election

Vance also played a central role in Dino Rossi's failed bid to become the Governor of Washington. After winning the first two statewide ballot counts, Secretary of State Sam Reed certified Rossi as the winner; however, a statewide hand recount resulted in the election of Democratic Party candidate Christine Gregoire.

The Rossi campaign and the Washington State Republican Party filed an election contest in Chelan County Superior Court. The controversy over the election lasted over six months, with Vance often serving as a spokesman for the party and Rossi's campaign.

Recent
On January 9, 2006, Vance announced he would resign his position and pursue opportunities in the private sector. He currently works as a public affairs consultant, a member of the management team of King County Assessor John Wilson, serves as a Senior Fellow at the Niskanen Center, is an adjunct professor at the University of Washington's Evans School of Public Affairs, and is a frequent media commentator on Washington State politics.

On September 8, 2015, Vance announced that he was running for the United States Senate. During the campaign he stated that could not support Donald Trump for President.  Vance lost by a significant margin in 2016 to incumbent Democrat Patty Murray, who received the most votes ever in a United States Senate election in Washington state.

In 2017, Vance joined the American Civil Liberties Union.

On March 15, 2022, Vance announced he was running for the Washington State Senate as an independent in the same 31st district he represented in the State House 30 years earlier.

Departure from Republican Party 
On September 29, 2017, Vance announced on KUOW's "Week in Review" podcast that he had left the Republican Party, saying the following:

I now consider myself an independent. I am no longer a Republican after 36 years...For years I've seen the party move away from things I believed in...It didn't begin with Trump, but he certainly accelerated the process...I just don't agree with [the Republican Party] on 90% of the issues they talk about today.

Vance said he would be focusing future efforts on helping to establish an independent centrist movement in the country and would encourage Independents across the country to run for office. A month earlier, Vance had formally announced his support of and participation in the Centrist Project, with the goal of electing enough centrist candidates that Republicans and Democrats would have to negotiate with each other.

Never Trump movement 
Vance joined The Lincoln Project as a senior advisor in 2020. He endorsed Joe Biden for president in the 2020 election. From February until December 2021, Vance was a signatory for the Stand Up Republic affiliated 'A Call for American Renewal' manifesto. This manifesto sought to oust Donald Trump as the presumptive Republican candidate for president in 2024 and dismantle or replace the Republican Party.

References

External links
Washington State Republican Party Officers

|-

1962 births
21st-century American politicians
Candidates in the 2016 United States Senate elections
King County Councillors
Living people
Members of the Washington House of Representatives
People from Auburn, Washington
State political party chairs of Washington (state)
Washington (state) Independents
Washington (state) Republicans
Western Washington University alumni